Nándor Bányai (born as Breier; 8 March 1928 – 8 December 2003) was a Hungarian football player and manager.

Career

Playing career
Born in Kispest, Bányai played club football for hometown side Budapesti Honvéd. He also represented the Hungarian national side, earned a total of 2 caps for the team in the spring of 1950. He had won five times the Hungarian national championships (1949–50, 1950-spring, 1952, 1954 and 1955)

Coaching career
Bányai managed some of Hungarian clubs as well as Zalaegerszeg, Kecskemét, Leninváros (Tiszaújváros), Debrecen, Sopron, and also worked in Poland, Algeria and Togo.

References

External links
https://opac-nevter.pim.hu/record/-/record/PIM131748
http://www.origo.hu/sport/futball/20031208elhunyt.html

1928 births
2003 deaths
Hungarian footballers
Budapest Honvéd FC players
Nemzeti Bajnokság I players
Hungary international footballers
Hungarian football managers
Zalaegerszegi TE managers
Budapest Honvéd FC managers
Debreceni VSC managers
Association football midfielders
Footballers from Budapest
20th-century Hungarian people